Fiordland College is a co-educational state secondary school for years 7–13 students. It is one of the two schools in Te Anau, New Zealand. 
Te Anau is situated on the shores of Lake Te Anau, at the gateway to New Zealand's largest National Park - Fiordland National Park.
Fiordland College is very involved in environmental education. It has been involved in the Kids Restore the Kepler project for a number of years. Through this, students are offered a vast range of opportunities including wildlife encounters, conservation projects and personal developments opportunities. Fiordland College also has a range of successful sport teams such as netball, rugby, field hockey, and kī-o-rahi.

References

External links
NZQA Provider details

Secondary schools in Southland, New Zealand
Fiordland
Te Anau